Girl Talk is an album by American jazz organist Shirley Scott recorded in 1967 for the Impulse! label.

Reception
The Allmusic review by Michael G. Nastos described it as "A bit sweet".

Track listing
 "Girl Talk" (Neil Hefti, Bobby Troup) - 4:55
 "Come Back To Me" (Burton Lane, Alan Jay Lerner) - 3:07
 "We'll Be Together Again" (Carl Fischer, Frankie Laine) - 3:40
 "Love Nest" (Louis Hirsch, Otto Harbach) - 3:13
 "Swingin' the Blues" (Count Basie, Ed Durham) - 3:55
 "Keep The Faith, Baby" (Shirley Scott) - 3:45
 "Chicago, My Kind of Town" (Jimmy Van Heusen, Sammy Cahn) - 4:45
 "On The Trail (From "Grand Canyon Suite")" (Ferde Grofé) - 3:42
 "You're A Sweetheart" (Jimmy McHugh, Harold Adamson) - 3:30
Recorded at Capitol Studios in New York City on January 12, 1967 (tracks 2, 3, 5 & 8) and August 22, 1966 (tracks 1, 4, 6 & 7)

Personnel
Shirley Scott — organ
George Duvivier - bass
Mickey Roker - drums

References

Impulse! Records albums
Shirley Scott albums
1967 albums
Albums produced by Bob Thiele